Chinna Mani is a 1995 Indian Tamil-language drama film directed by M. Thilakarajan. The film stars Napoleon and Kasthuri  with R. P. Viswam, Srividya, Anuradha, S. S. Chandran, Vadivelu and Anusha in supporting roles. It was released on 3 March 1995 and was a box office failure.

Plot 

Duraisamy Thevar is a kind-hearted village chief while his father Pulikesi Thevar is the nearby wicked village chief. Duraisamy hate his father since he betrayed his mother and married another woman. Chinna Mani is a poor maid who is rejected by the villagers. Being married and a widow at her young age, the villagers think that she brings bad luck. Soon, Pulikesi Thevar's first wife falls sick and compels her son to marry as soon as possible. In hurry, Duraisamy Thevar marries Chinna Mani for soothing his sick mother. The entire village is then in shock. Later, Duraisamy tells Chinna Mani the reason why he didn't get married for so many years. In the past, Duraisamy was in love with a Christian woman Princy. Her brothers opposed to their love. Her despair to marry her lover increased; she immolated herself. Duraisamy accepts to live with Chinna Mani but doesn't want to touch her. What transpires later forms the crux of the story.

Cast 

Napoleon as Duraisamy Thevar
Kasthuri as Chinna Mani
R. P. Viswam as Pulikesi Thevar
Srividya as Pulikesi Thevar's first wife
Anuradha as Pulikesi Thevar's second wife
S. S. Chandran
Vadivelu as Pechimuthu
Anusha as Princy
Raghavi as Parvathy
Vizhuthugal Latha as Kaveri
Vimalraj
K. Kannan
Pasi Narayanan as Narayanan
Meesai Murugesan
Bayilvan Ranganathan
Swamikannu as Manikkam
Vellai Subbaiah
Halwa Vasu
Joker Thulasi as Saavu Kodangi
Kadayam Raju
Sathish
Singamuthu
Roopa
Sangeetha
Vijay Babu in a guest appearance
Balaji Sakthivel as doctor (uncredited)

Soundtrack 
The music was composed by Deva, with lyrics written by Muthulingam, Kalidasan, Kadhal Mathi, S. Malar Maran and R. V. Udayakumar.

Reception 
R. P. R. of Kalki praised the debutant director for elegant screenplay, crisp dialogues and neatly done twists while also praising Deva for his unique background score.

References

External links 
 

1990s Tamil-language films
1995 drama films
1995 films
Films scored by Deva (composer)
Indian drama films